"Dead Presidents" is a 1996 song by American rapper Jay-Z. It was released as the first promotional single for Jay-Z's debut album Reasonable Doubt, though it did not directly appear on the album: a different version of the song with the same backing track and chorus but with different lyrics called "Dead Presidents II" appeared on Reasonable Doubt. "Dead Presidents II" was voted number 16 in About.com's Top 100 Rap Songs and number two in Rolling Stones Top 50 Jay-Z Songs.

The title is slang for money because portraits of dead United States presidents appear on most Federal Reserve Notes.

The song was produced by Ski. "Dead Presidents" samples multiple artists including Lonnie Liston Smith's "A Garden of Peace" for the track's melody and A Tribe Called Quest's "Oh My God (remix)" for its percussion; the chorus is a sample of Nas rapping "I'm out for dead presidents to represent me", from his 1994 song "The World Is Yours (Tip Mix)".

Music video
The music video features cameos by The Notorious B.I.G., AZ, Lil' Cease, Damon Dash, Kareem "Biggs" Burke, and Tyran "Ty Ty" Smith.

Feud with Nas
Nas was originally invited to re-rap the chorus for Jay-Z and appear in the track's music video, but he declined. Some view these two actions as the catalyst of the Jay-Z vs. Nas feud.

When Nas and Jay-Z directly feuded, both rappers discussed the merit of the sampling in the song in individual "diss" records. In Nas' track "Stillmatic Freestyle," he says: 

Jay-Z responds to Nas' claims in his song "Takeover" with the lines: 

The line was later used in Cassidy's 2005 hit "I'm a Hustla": 

In 2005 at Jay-Z's I Declare War concert, he performed "Dead Presidents II" with Nas, officially ending their feud.

Production
In a YouTube video called Ski Beatz - the making of Jay-Z's "Dead Presidents" beat Ski explains how he filtered out the high frequency content of the melody sample (using a lowpass filter) to achieve a more prominent bass line without replaying one in. Ski's Beats, Rhymes & Samples mixtape contains the Q-Tip remix in the context of a "Dead Presidents" sample because the original from "The World is Yours" had altered lyrics in connection to the sampled vocals. At the end of the sample from the chorus, you can hear the "Whose" from "Whose world is this?" from the beginning of the chorus of "The World is Yours".

Dead Presidents 3
Jay-Z recorded a track called "Dead Presidents 3" around the time of The Black Album but it was never completed. The unfinished song was leaked onto the internet in the fall of 2007, around the release of American Gangster. In it, Jay-Z referenced some of his lyrics from the original "Dead Presidents" and he used the sample but the sample was played in reverse and had a darker more atmospheric and sinister feel to it.

In July 2013 during a rare Twitter Q&A, a fan asked Jay-Z if "Dead Presidents 3" would be released, which led to Jay-Z giving Young Guru and Just Blaze the permission to release the track on Young Guru's SoundCloud account.

Remixes
Many artists have released remixed versions of Dead Presidents with original lyrics (often freestyles) performed over the original sample and chorus. Notable artists to release versions of Dead Presidents include Charles Hamilton, Lil B, Lil' Wayne, Drake, Slug of Atmosphere, Chamillionaire, J. Cole, Kendrick Lamar, Pusha T, Akala, Lupe Fiasco, Kano, Logic, Slaughterhouse, AZ, Curren$y, and DJ Premier who recorded a version with reworked instrumentals from Jay-Z's original lyrics and vocals from Nas' The World is Yours (Remix).

Charts

Weekly charts

Certifications

See also
List of songs recorded by Jay-Z

References

External links
Recording Industry Association of America Gold & Platinum Searchable Database

1996 singles
Jay-Z songs
Sequel songs
1996 songs
Songs written by Jay-Z
Songs written by Ski Beatz
Songs written by Nas
Songs written by Pete Rock